The market for luxury goods in China composes a significant proportion of all luxury goods sales worldwide.  In 2012, China surpassed Japan as the world's largest luxury market. 

According to a blue paper on commercial development in China, released in 2010 by the Chinese Academy of Social Sciences (CASS), China's luxury goods market had increased to US$9.4 billion by the end of 2009. This accounted for 27.5% of the world's luxury goods market, an increase from 25% in 2008. On current growth rates, the luxury goods market in China is expected to grow to US$14.6 billion by 2014.

Market characteristics
Chinese luxury goods consumers are younger than their European counterparts, belonging to the 18-50 age group, compared to Europe's consumers who are generally in the over 40 age group. For this reason, China's luxury goods market is expected to grow faster than that of Europe's. Many of the young luxury goods buyers are self-employed or professionals. According to the consulting firm McKinsey & Company, 80% of Chinese luxury goods buyers are under 45, compared with 30% of luxury goods buyers in the United States and 19% in Japan. Retail sales in China account for only 7% of global retail sales of luxury consumer goods; however, Chinese buyers account for 25% of global retail sales of luxury consumer goods. Many shops in international travel destinations have specialized staff devoted to Chinese customers. 

According to 2007 Global Luxury Survey by Time magazine, most luxury goods buyers in China buy luxury products as a status symbol. The top five luxury watch brands in the country are Rolex, Omega, Cartier, Vacheron Constantin, and Breitling.

In a confidential report titled "China Luxury Market study 2010" in November 2010, the management consulting firm Bain & Company noted the top three luxury brands in China are Louis Vuitton, Chanel and Gucci. According to the report, watches and bags led the growth of the luxury market in 2010. The report documented the top three luxury brands in the country for the following products:

Following a ban instituted in October, 2012 on government agencies purchasing luxury goods, often used as "gifts", sales of luxury goods in China remained strong, but slowed, even falling slightly for some luxury retailers in the 4th quarter of 2012.

As of February 2014 2/3rds of the luxury goods purchased by the wealthy in the People's Republic of China were purchased by tourists in Europe and the United States where, particularly in Europe, high-end retailers have hired staffed fluent in Mandarin.

Luxury cars
Major global luxury brands like Mercedes-Benz, BMW, Audi, and Lexus have operations in China. Audi, which has dominated China's luxury car market for more than two decades, is the market leader in the luxury car segment, with China being Audi's second largest market in the world. However Audi's market share in this category is gradually falling as BMW and Mercedes-Benz are adopting new strategies to boost sales. According to data from Global Insight, Audi's market share in China decreased from 66% in 2004 to 42% in 2009, while the market share of BMW and Mercedes-Benz increased from 7% to 23%, and 9% to 16%, respectively. BMW is enlarging its current plant in China and building a second one.

Audi is still the dominant choice of car in the government fleet market. BMW sales are growing but is perceived to be for the newly rich. Mercedes is seen to be for old folks. Brands such as BMW and Audi are designing customized cars for the Chinese luxury car market. BMW designed a model with a longer wheelbase especially for government officials in order to give the back seat passenger more space. 

According to Stephan Winkelmann, CEO of Lamborghini, "China's super car market is growing faster than our expectations, while the Western markets are declining. The strong demand will soon make China our second biggest market after the United States. If the high taxes on luxury cars are removed, China could very well become the biggest market."

As of 2013 the trend continued as the number of luxury cars and SUVs shown expanded at the Shanghai auto show and plans were announced by both foreign and domestic auto manufacturers to introduce new models in China and increase production of larger cars.

Watches
Swiss shipments of high-end watches, favored as gifts meant to curry favor and caricatured as a symbol of corruption, after peaking in 2012, dropped off in 2013.

Jewelry
In April, 2013 sales of gold and jewelry were 72% higher than in April, 2012.

See also
Economy of China
Automotive industry in China

References

Economy of China
Luxury